Alejandra Caraballo (born ) is a civil rights attorney and clinical instructor at the Harvard Law School Cyberlaw Clinic. Caraballo is a transgender rights activist, and she has spoken out against anti-LGBT legislation, policies, and rhetoric.

Early life and education 
When Caraballo was fifteen years old, her father became permanently disabled after losing an arm in a workplace accident. She said her family's struggles with the worker's compensation system, and the help from attorneys in resolving them "demonstrated to me the power that the law can have".

Caraballo earned a bachelor's degree in Government and World Affairs from the University of Tampa. She then earned a J.D. from Brooklyn Law School, where she studied with a concentration in intellectual property and media law. Shortly after she passed the bar exam, she came out as transgender.

Caraballo is Latina.

Career 
Caraballo was a staff attorney at the LGBTQ Law Project at the New York Legal Assistance Group, representing LGBT individuals seeking asylum and other immigrants. She then worked as a staff attorney with the Transgender Legal Defense & Education Fund, focusing on national advocacy. 

In 2021, she joined the Cyberlaw Clinic at the Harvard Law School as a clinical instructor. She and another instructor who began teaching the same month were the first trans women of color to teach at the law school. The New York Times described Caraballo as an expert on transgender issues; she has spent years monitoring anti-LGBT rhetoric online.

Political activism 
Starting in 2019, Caraballo served on a Brooklyn community board. In 2020 she announced her candidacy for New York City's 35th City Council district seat, and campaigned on defunding the New York City Police Department and redirecting the funds towards other services, as well as improving affordable housing. She ultimately left the race before the election.

Caraballo is a democratic socialist. , she was a member of the Stonewall Democratic Club of New York City.

Caraballo has been outspoken about what she sees as anti-LGBT legislation and policies, rhetoric from prominent individuals, and inadequate social media moderation surrounding the topic. In March 2022, she criticized the Florida Parental Rights in Education Act, also nicknamed the "Don't Say Gay" bill by its opponents, which was introduced in January 2022 and signed into law by Governor Ron DeSantis the following March. Caraballo described the bill as "an unprecedented attack on LGBT rights", predicting it would likely lead to a serious reversal in policies protecting LGBT rights in schools. Later that year, Caraballo was critical of Elon Musk's actions after acquiring Twitter, including his decision to reinstate accounts that had been suspended for threats, harassment, or misinformation.

Social media presence
In a tweet published on December 29, 2022, Caraballo suggested that the arrest of American-British social media personality Andrew Tate in Romania on human trafficking charges was facilitated by a video he posted online revealing his location by showing the name of a Romanian pizzeria. Caraballo's tweet quickly went viral and led to the proliferation of the rumor online. A spokesperson for Romania's Directorate for Investigating Organized Crime and Terrorism said the rumor was "funny" but untrue. Caraballo later acknowledged what she described as "fair criticism" that she had jumped to conclusions, but publicly defended her rationale for making the claim.

References 

1990s births
Living people
University of Tampa alumni
Brooklyn Law School alumni
Transgender rights activists
Civil rights lawyers
Harvard Law School faculty
Transgender academics
LGBT Hispanic and Latino American people